Eric II of Saxe-Lauenburg (1318/1320 – 1368) was a son of Duke Eric I of Saxe-Lauenburg and Elisabeth of Pomerania (*1291–after 16 October 1349*), daughter of Bogislaw IV, Duke of Pomerania. Eric II succeeded his father, after his resignation in 1338, as duke of Saxe-Ratzeburg-Lauenburg, a branch duchy of Saxe-Lauenburg. 

Eric II and his cousin Albert V of Saxe-Bergedorf-Mölln ravaged merchants and other travellers passing their duchies. In 1363 the city of Hamburg and Adolphus IX (aka VII) the Mild, Count of Schauenburg and Holstein-Kiel, supported by his relative Prince-Archbishop Albert II of Bremen, freed the streets northeast of the city from the brigandage by Eric II and Albert V, conquering the latter's castle in Bergedorf.

Marriage and issue
In 1342 or 1343 Eric married Agnes of Holstein (?–1386/7), daughter of John III, Count of Holstein-Plön, and they had the following children:
 Agnes (1353–1387), married William II, Duke of Brunswick-Lüneburg in 1363
 Eric IV (1354–1411)
 Jutta (1360–1388) married Bogislaw VI, Duke of Pomerania (1350–1393).
 Matilda (Mechthild) (? – after 1405), abbess of Wienhausen Abbey

Ancestry

Notes

 

 

|-

1318 births
1368 deaths
Eric 02
Eric 02